Thrizino-Buragaon is one of the 60 constituencies of Legislative Assembly of Arunachal Pradesh. West Kameng is the name of the district that contains Thrizino-Buragaon.

Member of Legislative Assembly

Election results

2019

See also
List of constituencies of Arunachal Pradesh Legislative Assembly
Arunachal Pradesh Legislative Assembly

References

External links
More about Thrizino

Villages in West Kameng district
Assembly constituencies of Arunachal Pradesh